John McGurk (17 September 1874 – 22 November 1944) was a British coal miner and trade unionist.

Born in Barnsley, West Riding of Yorkshire, McGurk grew up in Pendlebury, Lancashire, and began working at a coal mine aged 12. He became active in the Lancashire and Cheshire Miners' Federation (LCMF), and in 1908 was elected as the agent for its north-eastern area.

McGurk was also active in the Labour Party. He stood unsuccessfully in Darwen at the 1918 general election and again in 1922, and was elected to its National Executive Committee, serving as Chair of the Labour Party in 1918/19. He was also elected to Bury Town Council.

Although McGurk talked down the LCMF's chances of victory in their 1921 lock-out, he fully backed the 1926 general strike. In 1929, he was elected as President of the union, serving until shortly before his death in 1944. He also spent some time as a member of the General Council of the Trades Union Congress.

References

1874 births
1944 deaths
Councillors in Greater Manchester
Labour Party (UK) councillors
British trade union leaders
Members of the General Council of the Trades Union Congress
People from Pendlebury
People from Barnsley
Chairs of the Labour Party (UK)